Minobe (written:  or ) is a Japanese surname. Notable people with the surname include:

, Japanese fencer
, Japanese footballer and manager
, Japanese politician
, Japanese statesman and scholar of constitutional law
, Japanese artistic gymnast

Japanese-language surnames